Cat Lake is a lake in Kenora District in Northwestern Ontario, Canada. It is the source of the Cat River. The Cat Lake First Nation served by Cat Lake Airport is on the central north shore of the lake.

See also
List of lakes in Ontario

References

Other map sources:

Lakes of Kenora District